(Stylized OEDotai, also known as "Oedo Corps" in Japanese) is a villanous professional wrestling stable, currently performing in the Japanese professional wrestling promotion World Wonder Ring Stardom, and formerly in the Japanese independent scene. The stable currently consists of Natsuko Tora, Saki Kashima, Ruaka, Rina, Fukigen Death, Starlight Kid, Karma and Momo Watanabe.

History

Under Kyoko Kimura and Act Yasukawa (2015)

The group originally formed after Kimura Monster Gun's Kyoko Kimura, Kris Wolf and Hudson Envy joined forces with Act Yasukawa, Dragonita and Heidi Lovelace following the events of Stardom's 4th Anniversary show on January 18, 2015, defining themselves as the founding members of the unit. With Yasukawa and Kimura acting as co-leaders, they rebranded themselves with a Samurai theme due to Act, who was “The Samurai Spirit” of Stardom. Yasukawa won the Wonder of Stardom Championship the same night after defeating Mayu Iwatani. The first match under the Oedo Tai name saw Yasukawa, Hudson Envy and Kimura defeating Heisei-gun (Mayu Iwatani, Takumi Iroha and Yoshiko) in a six-woman tag team match on the second night of the Stardom New Year Stars 2015 which took place on February 1. On February 8, at Stardom Queen's Shout, the unit went for the first time after tag team gold, as Dragonita, Heidi Lovelace and Hudson Envy unsuccessfully challenged Heisei-gun (Io Shirai, Iwatani and Iroha) for the Artist of Stardom Championship. The rush continued on February 22, at Stardom Queen's Shout, Kimura and Hudson Envy teamed up and unsuccessfully challenged 7Kairi (Kairi Hojo and Nanae Takahashi) for the Goddess of Stardom Championship.

Yasukawa vs. Yoshiko incident
Yasukawa was in a feud with Yoshiko, whom she challenged for the World of Stardom Championship on February 22. Things got off-script during the match, while Yoshiko legitimately attacked and injured Yasukawa, therefore getting stripped of the title and being suspended for an indefinite period. Yasukawa, who was the Wonder of Stardom Champion at the time had to furtherly relinquish the title on May 1, due to complications from her multiple injuries caused by the incident. Three days later from the occurrence, Stardom held a press conference where Yoshiko apologised for her actions, but subsequently remained suspended.

On the fifth night of the Stardom Grows Up Star 2015 on April 12, Thunder Rosa teamed up with Kris Wolf to defeat Mayu Iwatani and Momo Watanabe, match which would mark her debut in the promotion as part of the stable. On the second night of the Stardom Golden Week Stars 2015 which took place on May 6, Star Fire marked her debut in the unit by teaming up with Kris Wolf in a losing effort to Io Shirai and Mayu Iwatani in the semi-finals of a tournament to crown new Goddess of Stardom Champions. Nikki Storm also made her first appearance in Stardom as part of the unit on June 14, at Stardom Galaxy Stars 2015, where she teamed up with Star Fire and unsuccessfully challenged Io Shirai and Mayu Iwatani for the Goddess of Stardom Championship. During the 5★Star Grand Prix 2015 tournament which took place beginning on August 23, La Rosa Negra joined the group, while competing in the B block of the tournament against stablemates Kris Wolf and Hudson Envy, Mayu Iwatani, Kaori Yoneyama and Io Shirai. On September 23, on the eight night of the tournament, La Rosa Negra successfully captured the High Speed Championship from stablemate Star Fire, with no major occurrences after the match. This was the latter's last match in Stardom and as part of Oedo Tai. At Stardom Mask Fiesta 2015 ~ Halloween Party on October 25, La Rosa Negra represented the stable in a six-persom masked tag team match where she teamed up with Black Dragon and Kaoru Maeda in a losing effort to Io Shirai, Mayu Iwatani and Último Dragón. At the 2015 edition of the Goddesses of Stardom Tag League, Kris Wolf and Kyoko Kimura teamed up to represent the stable in a first-round match where they fell short to Hiroyo Matsumoto and Santana Garrett on November 11. The other pair which represented Oedo Tai in the competition was the team of Act Yasukawa and the new member of the stable, Holidead, who joined the unit during the event on November 3. The two teamed up on the same night, falling short to Kairi Hojo and Haruka Kato.

Under Kimura's single leadership (2015–2017)
Act Yasukawa returned in the in-ring competition in September 2015 after recovering from the injuries suffered during the incident with Yoshiko, but only for a brief period until December 23, when she announced her retirement from professional wrestling, remaining the manager of the group until early 2016. Kyoko Kimura subsequently remained the sole leader of the unit since then, and spent her time recruiting a handful of wrestlers in the first couple of months. The unit always had their doors open for new competitors from outside of Japan.

On the first night of the Stardom 5th Anniversary on January 17, 2016, Kaitlin Diemond and Viper debuted in the stable by teaming up against Hyper Destroyers (Evie and Kellie Skater), obtaining the no. 1 contendership for the Goddess of Stardom Championship, match which they would lose three days later to the champions Thunder Rock (Io Shirai and Mayu Iwatani). On the fifth night of the Stardom Grows Up Stars 2016 on April 17, the luchadora Diosa Atenea teamed up with Kyoko Kimura as the new recruit of the unit, picking up a victory against Kagetsu and Lizzy Styles. The true purpose of the match was that Kimura tried to recruit Kagetsu in the stable but yet unsuccessfully. Six days later at Stardom Grows Up Stars 2016 - Kairi Hojo Homecoming on April 23, Kagetsu finally joined the stable and teamed up with Kyoko Kimura being accompanied at ring side by Act Yasukawa, to defeat Hiroyo Matsumoto and Jungle Kyona. On May 29, on the first night of the Stardom Shining Stars 2016 event, Leah Vaughan became the newest recruit of the unit as she teamed up with Kagetsu, Kris Wolf and Diosa Atenea to defeat Jungle Kyona and Thunder Rock (Io Shirai and Mayu Iwatani) in a six-man tag team match. The unit captured the first tag team gold at Stardom Premium Stars 2016 on June 16, when Kyoko Kimura and Kagetsu defeated Thunder Rock (Io Shirai and Mayu Iwatani) for the Goddess of Stardom Championship. On September 22, on the eight night of the Stardom 5★Star Grand Prix 2016, Kyoko Kimura and Kagetsu would team up with a mystery wrestler to go against JKGReeeeN (Jungle Kyona and Momo Watanabe) and Mayu Iwatani. That mystery partner was Hana Kimura, Kyoko's daughter who subsequently joined the stable. The three members of the unit picked up the victory. They would eventually become the strongest sub-group of the unit after winning the Artist of Stardom Championship]for the first time at Stardom in Shin-Kiba Taikai on October 2, by defeating Threedom (Io Shirai, Kairi Hojo and Mayu Iwatani).

Kyoko Kimura and Kagetsu represented the unit outside of Stardom at WAVE Happy New Year 2017 on January 8, an event promoted by Pro Wrestling Wave where they unsuccessfully challenged Misaki Ohata and Ryo Mizunami for the Wave Tag Team Championship.

Hana Kimura as the only member. The fall and rebirth of the stable (2017)

Kyoko Kimura retired from professional wrestling on January 22, 2017, at the Kyoko Kimura Retirement Produce Last Afro, an event promoted by the Japanese independent scene where she teamed up with Hana and her husband, mixed martial artist Isao Kobayashi in a losing effort to Aja Kong, Meiko Satomura & Minoru Suzuki. Kagetsu was handed Kyoko's jitte, symbolizing the start of his leadership. Along with Hana, Kris Wolf and others, they kept the Oedo Tai name going, but the group started to fall apart. Wolf took off for some international matches and Kagetsu more or less looked like he also retired. Hana was left alone and struggled to keep the unit active while taking the leadership for several months. She challenged Mayu Iwatani for the Wonder of Stardom Championship title at Stardom Shining Stars 2017 on June 11, with an extra stipulation. If Hana won, Mayu would join Oedo Tai, but if Mayu won, Oedo Tai would be forced to disband. The match ended in a no-contest when Kagetsu returned attacking Mayu and the referee. Right after that, Wolf returned after being away for a couple of months. Thunder Rosa, La Rosa Negra and Holidead would also emigrate from Japan to wrestle in the American scene and subsequently left the unit in May. After those several departures, the unit suffered a slight gimmick change as the second generation of Oedo Tai was truly born.

Under Kagetsu (2017–2020)

Kagetsu reinvented his look after returning on the fourth night of the Stardom Shining Stars 2017 on June 21, where she teamed up with Hana Kimura to defeat Hiroyo Matsumoto and Jungle Kyona for the Goddess of Stardom Championship. Due to limiting themselves to a trio, Kagetsu, Wolf and Hana Kimura would look for new recruits as they brought Tam Nakano to the unit on September 10, during the 5STAR Grand Prix. Another member presented by Kagetsu on November 4, during the Goddesses of Stardom Tag League was Sumire Natsu who came from Pro Wrestling Wave.

Unfortunately Tam Nakano was forced to leave the stable and join Queen's Quest after being eliminated the last in a 10-woman elimination tag team match which occurred on January 21, 2018, at Stardom 7th Anniversary. On March 25, Wolf left Stardom and subsequently Oedo Tai due to visa issues which prevented her to wrestle in Japan anymore. On April 15, HZK, Martina and Nao Yamaguchi joined the uint after the 2018 Stardom Drafts. On June 9, at Stardom Shining Stars, Kagetsu defeated Toni Storm to win the World of Stardom Championship. The stable made a couple of brief appearances in the American independent scene. On June 29, HZK, Kagetsu and Hana Kimura]represented the stable at Best in the World 2018, an event promoted by Ring of Honor.  At ROH Wrestling #358 on June 30, Hana Kimura and Kagetsu teamed up to defeat Jenny Rose and Mayu Iwatani. On September 24, during the 5 Star Grand Prix of 2018, Hana Kimura would take part in one of the biggest angles by turning on the unit. She attacked her former allies with a chair and lay a beating on her former tag partner Kagetsu. This would lead to a showdown between the two at Stardom True Fight 2018 in a no disqualification match that saw both new enemies collide in the Korakuen Hall. The match would end via referee's decision as Kagetsu got a measure of revenge over the new Hana Kimura who would later join the Tokyo Cyber Squad stable.

On the fourth night of the Stardom Shining Stars 2019 on January 2, Kagetsu, Sumire Natsu and HZK teamed up to face Jamie Hayter, Hana Kimura and Bobbi Tyler of Tokyo Cyber Squad in a six-man tag team match in which Hayter betrayed Kimura and Tyler, providing the victory of Oedo Tai's members. The Pro-Wrestling: EVE's member joined the unit right after the match. The stable was growing again, with Sendai Girls' Pro Wrestling's Andras Miyagi joining at Stardom Queen's Fest on February 17, as the "X", (that being the mystery tag team partner called by Stardom) of Kagetsu in the tag team match against JAN (Jungle Kyona and Natsuko Tora) which they won. After the 2019 drafts from April 14, Sumire Natsu, HZK and Andras Miyagi teamed up to defeat JAN (Natsuko Tora, Leo Onozaki and Saya Iida). Due to the draft results, Tora switched factions as she joined Oedo Tai Andras Miyagi was kicked out of the group after dropping the Artist of Stardom Championship alongside Kagetsu and Sumire Natsu to Queen's Quest's AZM, Momo Watanabe and Utami Hayashishita. HZK announced her retirement from professional wrestling took place on December 24, at Stardom Year-End Climax, where she fell short to Tora in a singles match.

On January 3, 2020, Saki Kashima betrayed Mayu Iwatani and Stars in a match against the one-time reformed tag team from Hana Kimura and Kagetsu, and joined the stable at the request of Natsu and Tora. On January 19, at the Stardom 9th Anniversary, Bea Priestley teamed up with Jamie Hayter to defeat Tokyo Cyber Squad's Jungle Kyona and Konami for the Goddess of Stardom Championship. Priestley later turned heel on Queen's Quest on the same night, joining Oedo Tai.

Under Natsuko Tora (2020–present)

2020
Kagetsu announced her retirement from professional wrestling on December 25, 2019. Her last match in Stardom took place on the sixth night of the Stardom New Years Stars 2020, on February 15, where she faced all the promotion's roster in a 25-woman gauntlet match also involving popular competitors such as Hiroyo Matsumoto, Arisa Hoshiki, Leo Onozaki and others. Kagetsu handed over the reigns of Oedo Tai upon her retirement, and she even symbolically passed the torch by giving Natsuko Tora her trademark Jutte. The latter adopted a new look and took Oedo Tai back to its roots as a heel faction, starting the third generation. At the Stardom Cinderella Tournament 2020, Natsuko Tora fell short to Giulia in the finals. At Stardom Cinderella Summer In Tokyo on July 26, 2020, Saki Kashima defeated Hina, and Natsuko Tora and Sumire Natsu defeated Death Yama-san and Rina. At the 2020 edition of the Goddesses of Stardom Tag League, several members of the unit worked under makeshift sub-groups of two in the tournament: Black Widows (Bea Priestley and Konami), and Devil Duo (Natsuko Tora and Saki Kashima). On October 3 at Stardom Yokohama Cinderella, Konami teamed up with her fellow Tokyo Cyber Squad stablemate Jungle Kyona in a Loser's unit must disband tag team match against Natsuko Tora and Saki Kashima who represented Oedo Tai. Konami turned on Kyona as she helped Tora and Kashima win the match, and later join the unit after Tokyo Cyber Squad's dissolution. On October 28, Big Match Rina joined the group. At Stardom Sendai Cinderella 2020 on November 15, Natsuko Tora, Rina and Saki Kashima fell short to Cosmic Angels (Tam Nakano, Mina Shirakawa and Unagi Sayaka), Bea Pristley dropped the SWA World Championship to Syuri and Konami unsuccessfully challenged Giulia for the Wonder of Stardom Championship.

2021
On February 20, 2021, Bea Priestley, Konami, Natsuko Tora and Saki Kashima teamed up to face STARS (Gokigen Death, Mayu Iwatani, Ruaka and Starlight Kid) in an eight-man tag team match. Ruaka turned on Iwatani, helping Oedo Tai's members win the match. They later recruited her as the newest member of the unit. At the Stardom 10th Anniversary on March 3, Tora and Kashima fell short to Donna Del Mondo's Maika and Himeka, failing to win the Goddess of Stardom Championship. Kagetsu and HZK made one-off in-ring returns at the Hana Kimura Memorial Show on May 23 show which marked one year since the death of Hana Kimura. They teamed up with Konami and Death yama-san who portraited the Tokyo Cyber Squad in a losing effort to Asuka, Syuri, Natsupoi, and Mio Momono. At Stardom Yokohama Dream Cinderella 2021 on April 4, Tora, Ruaka, Konami, Kashima and Rina defeated STARS (Mayu Iwatani, Saya Iida, Starlight Kid, Hanan and Gokigen Death) in a Ten-woman elimination tag team match, and since Gokigen Death was the last one eliminated, she was forced to join Oedo Tai. On the third night of the Stardom Cinderella Tournament 2021 on June 12, Tora, Konami, Gokigen Death, Ruaka and Kashima teamed up to defeat Stars (Mayu Iwatani, Starlight Kid, Hanan, Koguma and Rin Kadokura) in a Ten-woman elimination tag team match, and since Starlight Kid was lastly eliminated, she was forced to join Oedo Tai. At Yokohama Dream Cinderella 2021 in Summer on July 4, Konami and Fukigen Death defeated Maika and Lady C, Hanan and Hina, and fellow stablemates Saki Kashima and Rina in a Gauntlet tag team match, Starlight Kid and Ruaka fell short to Momo Watanabe and AZM and Tora unsuccessfully challenged Hayashishita for the World of Stardom Championship, losing by doctor stoppage after sustaining a knee injury during the match. Tora's injury made her pull out of the Stardom 5 Star Grand Prix 2021, where alongside Kashima, Konami, Fukigen Death, Starlight Kid and Ruaka were listed as participants of the tournament.

On September 30, 2021, Stardom announced Sumire Natsu's departure from the company and subsequently parted ways with the stable.

At Stardom 10th Anniversary Grand Final Osaka Dream Cinderella on October 9, Ruaka defeated Unagi Sayaka to win the Future of Stardom Championship, Saki Kashima & Rina defeated Lady C & Waka Tsukiyama, and Starlight kid successfully defended the High Speed Championship against Fukigen Death. At Kawasaki Super Wars, the first event of the Stardom Super Wars trilogy which took place on November 3, Ruaka successfully defended the Future of Stardom Championship against Lady C, Saki Kashima & Fukigen Death defeated Rina & Hanan in a 2021 Goddesses of Stardom Tag League group stage match, and Starlight Kid wrestled Momo Watanabe in a time-limit draw while defending her High Speed Championship. At Tokyo Super Wars on November 27, Ruaka defeated Mai Sakurai and Waka Tsukiyama to successfully defend the Future of Stardom Championship, Saki Kashima, Fukigen Death & Rina fell short to Mayu Iwatani, Hazuki & Hanan, Starlight Kid successfully defended the High Speed Championship against Koguma and Konami unsuccessfully challenged Syuri for the SWA World Championship in a UWF Rules Match also for the Stardom 5 Star Grand Prix 2021 Challenge Rights Certificate.

Momo Watanabe had been the victim of Starlight Kid's mind games as the latter's strategy to gain more recruits into Oedo Tai since the November 3 show. Their feud degenerated into an eight-woman elimination tag team match in which both of them would be the captains of their respective teams. The loser captain would be forced to join the enemy unit and if Kid lost she would also have to unmask. The match took place on December 18, at Osaka Super Wars, the event which represented the last part of the "Super Wars" trilogy. With the match coming down to the wire and Queen's Quest holding a 2 to 1 advantage over Starlight Kid a shocking moment occurred when Momo Watanabe betrayed her faction and hit her long-time tag team partner AZM over the head with a chair, handing the win to Oedo Tai and anointing herself the “Black Peach” of the group.

At Stardom Dream Queendom on December 29, Fukigen Death won a five-way match against Lady C, Saki Kashima, Rina, and Waka Tsukiyama, Starlight Kid retained the High Speed Championship against AZM and Koguma, Momo Watanabe teamed up with Hazuki against Takumi Iroha & Mayu Iwatani but she dumped Hazuki during the match, therefore, attracting a loss, and Konami faced a returning Giulia in a losing effort as her last match before a planned hiatus from professional wrestling.

2022

At Stardom Nagoya Supreme Fight on January 29, 2022, Momo Watanabe and Starlight Kid battled Oedo Tai's Utami Hayashishita and AZM in a winning effort as a result of a grudge tag team match, and Fukigen Death, Ruaka, Saki Kashima and Rina fell short to Momo Kohgo Elimination five-way match. At Stardom Cinderella Journey on February 23, 2022, Rina unsuccessfully faced Mai Sakurai and Waka Tsukiyama in a number one contender's match for the Future of Stardom Championship, Momo Watanabe & Ruaka defeated Utami Hayashishita & Lady C, Fukigen Death & Saki Kashima fell short to Mayu Iwatani & Tam Nakano, and Starlight Kid dropped the High Speed Championship to AZM. At Stardom New Blood 1 on March 11, 2022, Starlight Kid and Ruaka defeated World Woman Pro Wrestling Diana's Haruka Umesaki and Nanami. On the first night of the Stardom World Climax 2022 from March 26, Rina unsuccessfully challenged Hanan for the Future of Stardom Championship on the pre-show, Saki Kashima, Fukigen Death, and Ruaka competed in a six-woman tag team gauntlet match, also unsuccessfully, and Momo Watanabe teaming up with Starlight Kid as "Black Desire" succeeded in defeating Hazuki and Koguma to win the Goddesses of Stardom Championship. On the second night from March 27, Saki Kashima, Ruaka and Rina participated in a 18-women Cinderella Rumble match won by Mei Suruga and also involving other opponents from both Stardom and the independent scene such as Tomoka Inaba, Haruka Umesaki, Nanami, Maria, Ai Houzan, and Yuna Mizumori. Momo Watanabe picked up a win over Hazuki, and Starlight Kid fell short to Kairi. At Stardom Cinderella Tournament 2022, all the members of the stable participated in the competition with Saki Kashima scoring the best result by making it to the quarter-finals. At Stardom Golden Week Fight Tour on May 5, 2022, Saki Kashima, Ruaka & Rina fell short to Hanan, Saya Iida & Momo Kohgo in a six-woman tag team match, and Momo Watanabe & Starlight Kid dropped the Goddess of Stardom Championship back to Hazuki & Koguma. At Stardom Flashing Champions on May 28, 2022, Rina teamed up with Hina and Ami Sourei in a losing effort against Saya Iida, Momo Kohgo & Lady C, Ruaka unsuccessfully challenged Hanan for the Future of Stardom Championship, Fukigen Death unsuccessfully challenged Mayu Iwatani for the SWA World Championship, and Saki Kashima, Momo Watanabe & Starlight Kid defeated Maika, Himeka & Natsupoi to win the Artist of Stardom Championship. At Stardom Fight in the Top on June 26, 2022, Ruaka defeated Waka Tsukiyama and Unagi Sayaka in a three-way match, and Starlight Kid, Momo Watanabe & Saki Kashima successfullt defended the Artist of Stardom Championship against God's Eye's (Syuri, Ami Sourei & Mirai) and Donna Del Mondo's (Giulia, Maika & Mai Sakurai). At Stardom New Blood 3 on July 8, 2022, Starlight Kid, Ruaka and Rina teamed up with Haruka Umesaki to defeat Unagi Sayaka, Mina Shirakawa, Yuko Sakurai and Rina Amikura. At Mid Summer Champions in Tokyo, the first event of the Stardom Mid Summer Champions which took place on July 9, 2022, Saki Kashima, Ruaka, Rina & Fukigen Death defeated Mayu Iwatani, Hazuki, Koguma & Saya Iida, Starlight Kid unsuccessfully challenged Saya Kamitani for the Wonder of Stardom Championship and Momo Watanabe unsuccessfully challenged Syuri for the World of Stardom Championship. At Stardom in Showcase vol.1 on July 23, 2022, Kaori Yoneyama won a rumble match after returning her old "Gokigen Death" gimmick from her time in Stars, match which also involved Saki Kashima, Rina and Ruaka from the unit. On the same night, Momo Watanabe took part in a falls count anywhere match won by AZM and also involving Tam Nakano and Koguma, and Starlight Kid unsuccessfully competed in a casket match also involving Saya Kamitani and a reaper masked figure which was revealed to be Yuu. At Mid Summer Champions in Tokyo, the first event of the Stardom Mid Summer Champions which took place on July 9, 2022, Saki Kashima, Ruaka, Rina and Fukigen Death defeated Mayu Iwatani, Hazuki, Koguma and Saya Iida, Starlight Kid unsuccessfully challenged Saya Kamitani for the Wonder of Stardom Championship, and Momo Watanabe unsuccessfully challenged Syuri for the World of Stardom Championship. At Mid Summer Champions in Nagoya from July 24, 2022, Fukigen Death & Ruaka fell short to Mayu Iwatani & Momo Kohgo, and Starlight Kid, Momo Watanabe & Saki Kashima successfully defended the Artist of Stardom Championship against Giulia, Maika & Himeka. At Stardom x Stardom: Nagoya Midsummer Encounter on August 21, 2022, Ruaka & Rina competed in a three-way match won by Ami Sourei & Mirai and also involving Giulia & Mai Sakurai, and Saki Kashima, Momo Watanabe & Starlight Kid successfully defended the Artist of Stardom Championship against Mina Shirakawa, Unagi Sayaka & Saki. At Stardom New Blood 4 on August 26, 2022, Rina teamed up with Ram Kaicho to defeat Waka Tsukiyama and Momoka Hanazono, Starlight Kid & Haruka Umesaki lost to Ami Sourei & Mirai by disqualification, and Ruaka won a three-way match against Lady C and Chie Koishikawa. At Stardom in Showcase vol.2 on September 25, 2022, Starlight Kid fell short to Suzu Suzuki in a 5 Star Grand Prix Tournament match, and Momo Watanabe & Ruaka unsuccessfully challenged Giulia & Rina Yamashita in a Hardcore Rules Tag Team Match. At Stardom New Blood 5 on October 19, 2022, Rina teamed up with Ram Kaicho & Linda to defeat Mina Shirakawa, Waka Tsukiyama & Yuna Mizumori. Starlight Kid & Ruaka teamed up with Haruka Umesaki to defeat Mirai, Tomoka Inaba & Nanami. Umesaki joined Oedo Tai under the gimmick of "Karma". At Hiroshima Goddess Festival on November 3, 2022, Saki Kashim and Ruaka unsuccessfully faced Hazuki and Koguma, Natsuko Tora fell short to Utami Hayashishita in her return match which occurred in order to end their feud which abruptly stopped when Tora got injured on July 4, 2021, and Starlight Kid and Momo Watanabe unsuccessfully challenged Tam Nakano and Natsupoi for the Goddess of Stardom Championship. At Stardom Gold Rush on November 19, 2022, Natsuko Tora & Ruaka defeated Lady C & Miyu Amasaki, and Saya Iida & Momo Kohgo in a three-way tag team match and Starlight Kid & Momo Watanabe defeated Saki Kashima & Fukigen Death in a Tag League match. At Stardom in Showcase vol.3 on November 26, 2022, Starlight Kid competed in a four-way match resembling the 2022 FIFA World Cup won by Koguma and also involving AZM and Ram Kaicho, and Natsuko Tora & Saki Kashima fought Hazuki and a returning Sumire Natsu into a No Contest in a No Holds Barred Tag Team Match. At Stardom Dream Queendom 2 on December 29, 2022, Rina competed in a Stardom rambo, Natsuko Tora and Ruaka fought in a three-way match to determine the number one contenders for the Goddess of Stardom Championship won by Maika and Himeka and also involving Ami Sourei and Mirai, and Starlight Kid, Momo Watanabe and Saki Kashima dropped the Artist of Stardom Championship to Prominence (Risa Sera, Suzu Suzuki & Hiragi Kurumi).

2023
At Stardom New Blood 7] on January 20, 2023, Rina defeated Miran, Ruaka defeated Marika Kobashi, and Starlight Kid and Karma defeated Club Venus (Xia Brookside and Mariah May) in the quarterfinals of the inaugural New Blood Tag Team Championship tournament. At Stardom Supreme Fight 2023 on February 4, 2023, Starlight Kid, Haruka Umesaki and Ruaka fell short to Hazuki, Saya Iida and Koguma in a Triangle Derby I group stage match, Natsuko Tora and Fukigen Death competed in a call your shot match for a championship at choice, and Momo Watanabe unsuccessfully challenged Saya Kamitani for the Wonder of Stardom Championship.

Independent circuit (2015-present)
Multiple members of the stable are known to have worked for various promotions. Since La Rosa Negra used to wrestle in the American independent scene, she made an appearance at SHINE 36, an event promoted by Shine Wrestling and World Wrestling Network on July 22, 2016, where she teamed up with Amanda Carolina Rodriguez as Las Sicarias to unsuccessfully challenge BTY (Jayme Jameson & Marti Belle) for the Shine Tag Team Championship. La Rosa Negra's last match as part of the stable took part at Vendetta Pro Melee 2017 on May 19, an event promoted by Vendetta Pro Wrestling in partnership with the National Wrestling Alliance where she teamed up with Holidead, picking up a victory over The Ballard Brothers (Shane Ballard & Shannon Ballard) in an Intergender Tag Team Match. Jamie Hayter worked in several matches for other promotions while being part of the unit. At WWE NXT UK #42, an event promoted by WWE's NXT UK, she fell short to Viper. She also made an appearance for All Elite Wrestling on October 23, 2019, on AEW Dynamite, where she scored a defeat against Britt Baker. At Hana Kimura Memorial Show 2 on May 23, 2022, Rina defeated Sakura Hirota by taking part into a gauntlet match.

New Japan Pro Wrestling (2022-present)
Starlight Kid was part of the series of Stardom exhibition matches to promote female talent hosted by New Japan Pro Wrestling. On the second night of Wrestle Kingdom 16 on January 5, 2022, she teamed up with Mayu Iwatani in a losing effort against Tam Nakano and Saya Kamitani. At Historic X-Over on November 20, 2022, Natsuko Tora, Saki Kashima, Ruaka and Rina competed in the Stardom Rambo, and Starlight Kid and Momo Watanabe teamed up with Suzuki-gun's El Desperado and Douki in a losing effort against Tam Nakano, Natsupoi and Taichi and Yoshinobu Kanemaru.

Members

Current

Former

Sub-groups

Current

Former

Timeline

Championships and accomplishments

Alpha Omega Wrestling
AOW Women's Championship (1 time) – Viper
JWP Joshi Puroresu
JWP Openweight Championship (1 time) – Kyoko Kimura
JWP Junior Championship (1 time) – Hana Kimura
JWP Tag Team Championship (1 time) – Kyoko Kimura with Hanako Nakamori
Oz Academy
Oz Academy Openweight Championship (1 time) – Fukigen Death
Oz Academy Tag Team Championship (1 time) – Fukigen Death with Yuu
Oz Academy Pioneer Championship (1 time) – Fukigen Death
Pure-J
Princess of Pro Wrestling Championship (1 time) – Hana Kimura
Daily Sports Women's Tag Team Championship (1 time) – Kyoko Kimura with Hanako Nakamori
Pro Wrestling Illustrated
Ranked Starlight Kid No. 9 of the top 150 female singles wrestlers in the PWI Women's 150 in 2022
Ranked Kagetsu No. 18 of the top 100 female singles wrestlers in the PWI Women's 50 in 2018
Ranked Priestley No. 19 of the top 100 female singles wrestlers in the PWI Women's 50 in 2019
Ranked Momo Watanabe No. 39 of the top 150 female singles wrestlers in the PWI Women's 50 in 2022
Ranked Thunder Rosa No. 43 of the top 50 female singles wrestlers in the PWI Women's 50 in 2016
Ranked Hayter No. 47 of the top 100 female singles wrestlers in the PWI Women's 50 in 2020
Ranked La Rosa Negra No. 48 of the top 50 female singles wrestlers in the PWI Women's 50 in 2015
Revolution Pro Wrestling
RevPro British Women's Championship (1 time) – Jamie Hayter
Vendetta Pro Wrestling
NWA Western States Tag Team Championship (1 time) – Thunder Rosa & Holidead
Women Wrestling Stars
WWS Championship (1 time) – Diosa Atenea
World Wonder Ring Stardom
World of Stardom Championship (1 time) – Kagetsu
Wonder of Stardom Championship (1 time) – Act Yasukawa
Goddess of Stardom Championship (5 times) – Kagetsu & Kyoko Kimura (1), Kagetsu & Hana Kimura (1), Bea Priestley & Jamie Hayter (1), Bea Priestley & Konami (1), Momo Watanabe & Starlight Kid (1)
Artist of Stardom Championship (4 times) – Hana Kimura, Kagetsu & Kyoko Kimura (1), Andras Miyagi, Kagetsu & Sumire Natsu (1), Bea Priestley, Natsuko Tora & Saki Kashima (1), Saki Kashima, Momo Watanabe & Starlight Kid (1)
High Speed Championship (5 times) – Star Fire (1), La Rosa Negra (1), Kris Wolf (1), HZK (1), and Starlight Kid (1)
SWA World Championship (2 times) – Jamie Hayter (1) and Bea Priestley (1)
Future of Stardom Championship (1 time) - Ruaka
5★Star GP Award (3 times)
5★Star GP Best Match Award
(2017) – 
5★Star GP Technical Skill Award (2021) – 
 5★Star GP Outstanding Performance Award (2022) 
Stardom Year-End Award (8 times)
Best Tag Team Award 
Best Technique Award 
Fighting Spirit Award 
Special Merit Award 
Best Unit Award (2019, 2021)
Shining Award 
World Woman Pro-Wrestling Diana
World Woman Pro-Wrestling Diana Tag Team Championship (2 times, current) – Umesaki and Death

Luchas de Apuestas record

See also
Neo Stardom Army
Cosmic Angels
Queen's Quest
Donna Del Mondo
God's Eye
Stars

Notes

References

External links 

 

Independent promotions teams and stables
Japanese promotions teams and stables
Women's wrestling teams and stables
World Wonder Ring Stardom teams and stables